Turkey Hughes Field is a baseball stadium in Richmond, Kentucky, United States.  It is home to the Eastern Kentucky Colonels baseball team of the NCAA Division I Ohio Valley. The stadium opened in the 1960s and is named in honor of former Eastern Kentucky baseball coach Turkey Hughes. 

In 2006, EKU's athletic department announced plans to completely rebuild the stadium with a $2 million initiative.  In 2009, the university spent over $500,000 to install artificial turf, a batter's eye, and a brick backstop. Major renovations were made and completed in 2016.

See also
 List of NCAA Division I baseball venues

References

External links
Description at EKUsports.com
EKU Baseball Stadium Project

College baseball venues in the United States
Baseball venues in Kentucky
Eastern Kentucky Colonels baseball
Buildings and structures in Madison County, Kentucky
1960s establishments in Kentucky
Sports venues completed in the 1960s